Fitzgerald Glacier is a prominent valley glacier draining to Lady Newnes Bay from the ice cascades on the south and west slopes of Mount Murchison, in Victoria Land, Antarctica. At the mouth it coalesces with the Icebreaker Glacier before debouching on Lady Newnes Bay. It was explored by the New Zealand Geological Survey Antarctic Expedition, 1958–59, and named by the New Zealand Antarctic Place-Names Committee for E.B. Fitzgerald, deputy leader of the expedition.

References 

Glaciers of Victoria Land
Borchgrevink Coast